PSW-155 is a Constituency reserved for a female in the Provincial Assembly of Sindh.

General elections 2013

General elections 2008

See also

 Sindh

References

External links 
 Official Website of Government of Sindh

Constituencies of Sindh